This is a list of members of the Tasmanian House of Assembly between the 1900 election and the 1903 election.

Party affiliations were relatively loose during the period, although a Liberal grouping had formed over the 1890s around Sir Edward Braddon, the former Premier of Tasmania, and Andrew Inglis Clark. A separate grouping, generally described as Ministerial, supported Elliott Lewis, who was Premier for the entire parliamentary term. Only one Labor candidate ran in the election, in only the second contest entered by the party.

The 1900 election was the second to use a limited version of the Hare-Clark system within Hobart and Launceston, which were given 6 and 4 seats respectively, while still using first past the post single-member constituencies elsewhere in the state. Following this term, the system largely returned to its pre–1897 state, but at the 1909 election, the entire State was redivided into five electorates using the Hare-Clark system.

Notes

  On 17 April 1900, Liberal member for Hobart, Edward Miles, resigned. Liberal candidate Herbert Nicholls won the resulting by-election on 15 May 1900.
  On 14 November 1900, Ministerial member for Hobart, John Bradley, died. Independent candidate Charles Hoggins won the resulting by-election on 5 December 1900.
  On 29 March 1901, Liberal member for West Devon, Sir Edward Braddon, resigned to contest the inaugural federal election. Liberal candidate Sir John McCall won the resulting by-election on 30 April 1901.
  In September 1901, Independent member for Launceston, Alexander Fowler, resigned. Liberal candidate Samuel Sutton won the resulting by-election on 4 October 1901.
  On 3 April 1902, the Liberal member for Latrobe, William Aikenhead, died. Liberal candidate Henry Murray was elected unopposed on 19 April 1902.
  In March 1902, Ministerial member for Launceston, William Hartnoll, resigned to contest a federal by-election following the death of Frederick Piesse. Liberal candidate David Storrer won the resulting by-election on 22 April 1902. Ironically, Storrer himself resigned the seat several months after the following election to defeat Hartnoll in Bass.
  On 26 May 1902, the Liberal member for Selby, Frank Archer, died. At the resulting by-election on 11 June 1902, Liberal candidate Thomas Massey was elected unopposed.

Sources
 
 Parliament of Tasmania (2006). The Parliament of Tasmania from 1856

Members of Tasmanian parliaments by term
20th-century Australian politicians
19th-century Australian politicians